Robert Reed, Jr. (born February 23, 1943) is a former American football offensive lineman in the National Football League for the Washington Redskins.  He played college football at Tennessee State University and was drafted in the 16th round of the 1965 NFL Draft.  Reed was also selected in the 12th round of the 1965 AFL Draft by the Houston Oilers.

External links
Just Sports Stats

People from Longview, Texas
American football offensive guards
Tennessee State Tigers football players
Washington Redskins players
1943 births
Living people
Canadian football offensive linemen
Winnipeg Blue Bombers players
American players of Canadian football
Players of American football from Texas